Muriel Angelus (born Muriel E S M Findlay, 10 March 1912 – 26 June 2004) was an English stage, musical theatre, and film actress.

Born in Lambeth, South London, to Scottish parentage, her father was a chemist. She was educated at the Ursiline Convent in London. She developed a sweet-voiced soprano at an early age. She made her debut on stage at the age of 12, appearing in a play she had written herself called The Sister Key. Also at 12, she acted in a production of Henry VIII.

She went on to sing in music halls and to dance in a West End production of The Vagabond King (1927).

She entered films toward the end of the silent era with The Ringer (1928), the first of three movie versions of the Edgar Wallace play. Her second film, Sailor Don't Care (1928) was important only in that she met her first husband, Scots-born actor John Stuart on the set; her role was excised from the film.

Though in her first sound picture, Night Birds (1930), she got to sing a number, most of her films did not use her musical talents. The sweet-natured actress who played both ingenues and 'other woman' roles co-starred with husband Stuart in No Exit (1930), Eve's Fall (1930) and Hindle Wakes (1931), and appeared with British star Monty Banks in some of his film farces, including My Wife's Family (1931) and So You Won't Talk (1935). Muriel received a career lift with the glossy musical London hit Balalaika. She also acted in the British serial Lloyd of the C.I.D..

She portrayed Adriana in the original Broadway production of The Boys From Syracuse (1938), and Marie Sauvinet in the Broadway production of Sunny River (1941). In turn, she received a contract with Paramount Pictures, but never became a star and is largely remembered solely by the acting buffs and nostalgists. Her last known film role was in The Great McGinty (1940). She then revived her Broadway career and had a great success in the musical comedy, Early to Bed (1943).

Her final performance came in 1946, after her marriage to Paul Lavalle. In 1959 she resisted the efforts of Richard Rodgers to secure her for the part of the Mother Abbess in the first Broadway production of The Sound of Music.

Interviewed in 1996, she said it had been a mistake for her to leave England. "I was caught up in the glamour, but once in Hollywood I was nothing more than a tiny craft battling in an ocean beside much weightier ships."

Angelus died at a nursing home in Harrisonburg, Virginia, aged 92, survived by her daughter from her second marriage. She was cremated and her ashes returned to her surviving  daughter.

Filmography

References

External links

 
 
 
 
 
 
 
 
 

1912 births
2004 deaths
English expatriates in the United States
English film actresses
English musical theatre actresses
English stage actresses
Actresses from London
English people of Scottish descent
20th-century English actresses
20th-century English women singers
20th-century English singers